Richard Howard Ichord Jr. (June 27, 1926 – December 25, 1992) was U.S. representative from Missouri and a significant U.S. anti-Communist political figure. A member of the Democratic Party, he served as the last chairman of the House Un-American Activities Committee between 1969 and 1975 (called the House Internal Security Committee since 1969).

Background

Richard H. Ichord Jr. was born in Licking, Missouri. From 1944 to 1946 he served in the United States Navy. He attended the University of Missouri in Columbia, receiving a Bachelor of Science degree in 1949, and a Juris Doctor in 1952.

Career

Ichord worked as a lawyer in private practice.

Government service

From 1952 to 1960, he was a member of the Missouri State House of Representatives, where he served as speaker pro tempore in 1957, and Speaker in 1959.

Elected as the U.S. representative for Missouri's 8th district in 1960, he was re-elected nine times, serving in the Eighty-seventh through Ninety-sixth Congresses (1961–1980). Ichord voted in favor of the Civil Rights Acts of 1964 and 1968, and the Voting Rights Act of 1965. In addition to the House Un-American Activities Committee, he also served on the House Armed Services Committee. He did not run for reelection in 1980.

Later years
After his retirement from office, Ichord became a professional advocate in Missouri and served as co-chairman of American Freedom Coalition with Congressman Bob Wilson.

Death

Ichord died age 66 on December 25, 1992.  Survivors include his wife Millicent and three children, Richard, Pam and Kyle.  Six grandchildren, Loran, Megan, Chase, Alexa, Courtney and Flemming.

Works

He co-authored the book Behind Every Bush: Treason or Patriotism (1979) with Boyd Upchurch.

See also
 List of members of the House Un-American Activities Committee

References

 "ICHORD, Richard Howard, II, (1926 - 1992)", Congressional Biographical Directory of the United States 1774–Present. Retrieved January 12, 2006.
  The Political Graveyard: Index to Politicians: I to Ingersol". Retrieved January 12, 2006.
 "SHSMO--Ichord, Richard H. (1926-1992), Papers, 1960-1980 (C1269)--INVENTORY". Retrieved June 25, 2013.

1926 births
1992 deaths
Democratic Party members of the Missouri House of Representatives
Speakers of the Missouri House of Representatives
University of Missouri alumni
Democratic Party members of the United States House of Representatives from Missouri
20th-century American politicians
People from Texas County, Missouri
Military personnel from Missouri
American anti-communists